Main page: List of Canadian plants by family

Families:
A | B | C | D | E | F | G | H | I J K | L | M | N | O | P Q | R | S | T | U V W | X Y Z

Xyridaceae 

 Xyris difformis — Carolina yellow-eyed-grass
 Xyris montana — northern yellow-eyed-grass

Zannichelliaceae 

 Zannichellia palustris — horned pondweed

Zosteraceae 

 Phyllospadix scouleri — Scouler's surf-grass
 Phyllospadix serrulatus — serrulate surf-grass
 Phyllospadix torreyi — Torrey's surf-grass
 Zostera marina — sea-wrack

Canada,family,X